Periomphale balansae is a species of shrub in the Alseuosmiaceae family. It is endemic to New Caledonia and the only species of the genus Periomphale. It has sometimes been included in the genus Wittsteinia.

References

Endemic flora of New Caledonia
Alseuosmiaceae
Monotypic Asterales genera
Taxa named by Henri Ernest Baillon